Low-voltage electron microscope (LVEM) is an electron microscope which operates at accelerating voltages of a few kiloelectronvolts or less. Traditional electron microscopes use accelerating voltages in the range of 10-1000 keV.

Low voltage imaging in transmitted electrons is possible in many new scanning electron detector.

Low cost alternative is dedicated table top low voltage transmission electron microscope. While its architecture is very similar to a conventional transmission electron microscope, it has a few key changes that enable it to take advantage of a 5 keV electron source, but trading off many advantages of higher voltage operations, including higher resolution,  possibility of X-ray microanalysis and EELS, etc... Recently a new low voltage transmission electron microscope has been introduced that operates at variable voltage ranges between 6–25 kV.

Advantages

Higher contrast
A substantial decrease of electron energy allows for a significant improvement of contrast of light elements. The comparison images below show that decreasing the acceleration voltage from 80 kV to 5 kV significantly enhances the contrast of test samples. The improved contrast is a direct result of increased electron scattering associated with a reduced accelerating voltage.

LVEM brings an enhancement of imaging contrast nearly twenty times higher than for 100 kV. This is very promising for biological specimens which are composed from light elements and don't exhibit sufficient contrast in classical TEMs.

Further, a relatively low mean free path (15 nm) for organic samples at 5 kV means that for samples with constant thickness, high contrast will be obtained from small variations in density. For example, for 5% contrast in the LVEM bright field image, we will only need to have a difference in density between the phases of 0.07 g/cm3. This means that the usual need to stain polymers for enhanced contrast in the TEM (typically done with osmium or ruthenium tetraoxide) may not be necessary with the low voltage electron microscopy technique.

Stain not required
The improved contrast allows for the significant reduction, or elimination, of the heavy metal negative staining step for TEM imaging of light elements (H, C, N, O, S, P). While staining is beneficial for experiments aimed at high resolution structure determination, it is highly undesirable in certain protein sample preparations, because it could destabilize the protein sample due to its acid pH and relatively high heavy metal concentration. The addition of stain to sectioned samples such as biological materials or polymers can also introduce imaging artifacts.

LVEM experiments carried out on an extracted membrane protein sample that was analyzed with and without the staining procedure show a marked improvement in the appearance of the sample when standard staining is omitted. Results show that LVEM could be even more useful than conventional EM for this particular application because it avoids the potentially disrupting staining step, thus providing an undisturbed image of the protein's aggregation state.

Additionally, The ability to eliminate the staining step could aid to improve safety in the lab, as common heavy metal stains, such as uranyl acetate do have associated health risks.

Resolution
The first low-voltage electron microscopes were capable of spatial resolutions of about 2.5 nm in TEM, 2.0 nm in STEM, and 3.0 nm in SEM modes. The SEM resolution has been improved to ~1.2 nm at 800 eV by 2010, while a 0.14 nm TEM resolution at 15 keV has been reported in 2016.

Limitations
Currently available low voltage microscopes are only able to obtain resolutions of 1.0–3 nanometers. While this is well beyond resolutions possible from optical (light) microscopes, they are not yet able to compete with the atomic resolution obtainable from conventional (higher voltage) electron microscopes.

Low voltage limits the maximum thickness of samples which can be studied in the TEM or STEM mode. Whereas it is about 50-90 nm in conventional TEM, it decreases to around 20–65 nanometers for LVEM @ 5 kV. However, thicknesses of the order of 20 nm or less are required to attain the maximal resolution in the TEM and STEM modes 5 kV.. These thickness are sometimes achievable with the use of an ultramicrotome.

in 2015 these limitations were overcome with a 25 kV low voltage electron microscope that can produce high quality results with thin sectioned samples up to around 100 nm+.

See also
Electron microscope
Transmission electron microscope (TEM)
High-resolution transmission electron microscopy (HRTEM)
Scanning electron microscope (SEM)
Scanning transmission electron microscope (STEM)
Low-energy electron microscopy (LEEM)
Electron diffraction
Low-energy electron diffraction (LEED)

Application areas
LVEM is especially efficient for the following applications.

Antibodies
Cell biology
Drug discovery
Education
Histology
Materials science
Nanomedicine
Nanoparticles
Nanotubes
Pathology
Polymers
Proteins
Tissue samples
Toxicology
Viruses

References

External links
WENDMANs VIEWS on NANOTECH Blog
LVEM5 low voltage electron microscope from Delong America

Electron microscopy
Scientific techniques